Henry Filmer (died 1543) was a 16th-century English Protestant martyr, one of the Windsor Martyrs, during the reign of Henry VIII.

Filmer was a Protestant tailor and church warden of St John the Baptist Church, Windsor, Berkshire who complained about the overly Catholic sermons of the vicar. He gained the support of the Bishop of Salisbury much to the consternation of a former Catholic mayor of the town, William Simonds. His powerful friend, Dr John London, who was Bishop Gardiner's agent, arrested Filmer, along with four others, and, on 4 August 1543, he, Robert Testwood and Anthony Pearson were burnt to death.

References

External links
Royal Berkshire History: The Windsor Martyrs

16th-century Protestant martyrs
People executed under Henry VIII
People executed for heresy
Executed British people
People from Windsor, Berkshire
1543 deaths
Year of birth unknown
Executed English people
People executed by the Kingdom of England by burning
16th-century English businesspeople
Protestant martyrs of England